John Deng Geu (born January 1, 1997) is a Ugandan professional basketball player who last played for the Texas Legends of the NBA G League. He played college basketball for the North Dakota State Bison and the North Texas Mean Green.

Early life
Geu was born in a refugee camp in Uganda as a son of South Sudanese parents. At age 6, he relocated to North Dakota.

College career
In April 2019, Deng Geu left North Dakota State Bison men's basketball team. Geu was eligible to play immediately and did not have to sit out one year. 

There, he averaged 9.6 points per game in his last season. He appeared in a total of 97 games in three seasons for NDSU and made one start in 2016-17. Geu left NDSU with 645 points (6.6/game), 335 rebounds, and 57 blocks.

Deng Geu later joined the University of North Texas where he graduated in 2020.

Professional career
In September 2020, he signed his first professional contract with Horsens IC, holder of six titles in the Basketligaen, Denmark's top basketball league.

On July 21, 2021, he has signed with Rasta Vechta of the German ProA. In five games, Geu averaged 1.4 points and 2.8 rebounds per game. On November 15, 2021, he was acquired by the Texas Legends of the NBA G League.

National team
Deng Geu has been a member of Uganda's national basketball team, nicknamed the Silverbacks.

At the 2019 FIBA Basketball World Cup qualification in Nigeria he averaged 13.3 points and 11.3 rebounds per game. He further took part in the AfroCan 2019 qualifiers.

Player profile
Horsens IC publicly stated that they hired Deng because of his defensive abilities.

References

External links
FIBA profile 
Profile at Eurobasket.com
North Texas Mean Green bio

1997 births
Living people
Dinka people
Horsens IC players
North Dakota State Bison men's basketball players
North Texas Mean Green men's basketball players
Power forwards (basketball)
SC Rasta Vechta players
Texas Legends players
Ugandan expatriate sportspeople in Denmark
Ugandan expatriate sportspeople in the United States
Ugandan men's basketball players